The 2015 Valais Cup was an international football tournament that is part of the Valais Football Summer Cups. Matches were played in July in Switzerland and France. It was the third running of the competition, following the 2014 edition. The tournament consisted of four matchdays for a total of five matches.

Participants
The tournament features European top-clubs:
 Lyon
 PSV Eindhoven
 Basel
 Sion
 Shakhtar Donetsk

Results

References

External links
 Official website

2015
2015–16 in Swiss football
2015–16 in French football